José Avendaño (born 12 February 1912, date of death unknown) was a Chilean footballer. He played in 12 matches for the Chile national football team from 1935 to 1941. He was also part of Chile's squad for the 1935 South American Championship.

References

External links
 

1912 births
Year of death missing
Chilean footballers
Chile international footballers
Place of birth missing
Association football forwards
Magallanes footballers